Bambi Linn (born Bambina Linnemeier; April 26, 1926) is an American dancer, choreographer, and actress.

Linn trained extensively with noted choreographer Agnes de Mille. At the age of 17, she made her  Broadway debut in the original production of Oklahoma! (1943). With the death of actor George S. Irving, she is the last surviving cast member of Oklahoma!'''s opening night.

De Mille used her again as Louise in Carousel (1945), for which she earned a Theatre World Award. Linn repeated the role in the 1957 revival at City Center. Her other Broadway credits include the title role in Alice in Wonderland (1947) and Blanche in I Can Get It for You Wholesale (1962). Linn, who was a guest soloist with American Ballet Theatre, continued making occasional stage appearances until the early 1980s.

In the 1950s, Linn was best known as half of a ballroom dance team with her first husband Rod Alexander. The two made frequent appearances on TV's Your Show of Shows, The Colgate Comedy Hour, Toast of the Town, and Max Liebman Presents, and others. Linn made only one film appearance: as the fantasy Laurey in the extended "Dream Ballet" sequence in Oklahoma! (1955). She and Alexander created a similar dream ballet for the live 1955 broadcast of The Desert Song.

Linn has four children, and raised them in Westport, Connecticut.

 References 

External links

Brief article on Bambi Linn
Photograph of Rod Alexander and Bambi Linn
The Bambi Linn Collection is held by the Jerome Lawrence and Robert E. Lee Theatre Research Institute, The Ohio State University Libraries.

Further reading
Wilk, Max.  OK! The Story of Oklahoma!: A Celebration of America's Most Beloved Musical.''  Rev. ed.  New York: Applause Books, 2002.  .

1926 births
Living people
American female dancers
American musical theatre actresses
Dancers from New York (state)
21st-century American women